Kaina can mean:
 Kaina (Manipur), a small hillock in Manipur sacred to Hindu
 Kaina, Samastipur, a village in Samastipur district
 KAINA, an American singer